Stadionul Dumitru Tică Popescu is a multi-purpose stadium in Pucioasa, Romania. It is currently used mostly for football matches, is the home ground of FC Pucioasa and has a capacity of 1,000 seats. In the past, the stadium was also the home ground of other local teams such as Viitorul Pucioasa or PAS Pucioasa.

References

External links
Stadionul Dumitru Tică Popescu at soccerway.com

Football venues in Romania
Sport in Dâmbovița County
Buildings and structures in Dâmbovița County